Juan Manuel Pino Forero (born in Panama City, 3 November 1969) is the minister of public security of Panama.

References

 

1969 births
Living people
People from Panama City
Government ministers of Panama